The St Kilda Festival, held every February (except 2021), is a free celebration of Australian music, summer, and St Kilda. Programming includes music, dance, children's activities, comedy, poetry, visual art, theatre, outdoor cinema, beach sports, and fora.

References

External links
St Kilda Festival

Festivals in Melbourne
Music festivals in Melbourne